The Last Kiss is the third studio album by American rapper Jadakiss. The album was released on April 7, 2009, on D-Block, Ruff Ryders, Roc-A-Fella and Def Jam, after numerous delays. The album features guest appearances from Faith Evans, Swizz Beatz, Bobby V, Pharrell Williams, OJ da Juiceman, Sheek Louch, Mary J. Blige, Styles P, Ghostface Killah, Ne-Yo, Raekwon,  Young Jeezy, D-Block, U.S.D.A., Lil Wayne, & Avery Storm. Production on the album is handled by The Alchemist, Buckwild, Swizz Beatz, Neo da Matrix, The Neptunes, Baby Grand, Eric Hudson, Needlz, Sean C & LV.

The album was the final release on Roc-A-Fella Records by an artist other than Jay-Z or Kanye West.

The first official single, "By My Side" featuring Ne-Yo was released on October 7, 2008 and the second single, "Can't Stop Me", which has peaked at #78 on the Billboard Hot Rap Tracks, was released on February 17, 2009. "Letter to B.I.G" was released as a promo single from the album and was also included on the soundtrack to the motion picture Notorious released on March 10, 2009. "Death Wish" was released as the third official single on March 24, 2009 and features Lil Wayne. The fourth and final single "Who's Real" was digitally released on May 5, 2009, released for airplay on June 9, 2009 and officially released on June 16, 2009. The album was given mixed to positive reviews from music critics.

Background
After securing a new deal with  Jay-Z and Roc-A-Fella Records, Jadakiss began recording in 2008. After multiple push backs, the album was given an April 7, 2009 release date.

The original album title was Kiss My Ass, however Jada decided to change the album title:

I had to change the name of my album because "Kiss My Ass" wasn’t testing well at retail; not even with the exclamations or none of that so we had to change it to The Last Kiss, Jada explained during an interview with music website, BestofBothOffices.com.

As The Last Kiss might lead some to believe that it could be Jadakiss' final album, he immediately stated that he has no plans to retire anytime soon and explained the meaning behind the album's title.

Some people asked me if this was my last album, nah, it’s just the first album was Kiss tha Game Goodbye, the second album was The Kiss of Death, so this one is The Last Kiss; it’s the closing of a trilogy. This is the last time the word "Kiss" is going to be in any of my album titles.

Critical reception

The Last Kiss received generally positive reviews from music critics. At Metacritic, which assigns a normalized rating out of 100 to reviews from critics, the album received an average score of 61, which indicates "generally favorable reviews", based on 7 reviews. David Jeffries of AllMusic said, "In a genre where albums frequently miss their street date, Jadakiss' The Last Kiss is an especially late hip-hop release, having been pushed back, retitled, and retooled numerous times. This problematic arrival shows too in the final product, but the problem may not be the much maligned rapper's ability or inspiration but the constant mishandling of his material. So many prime street cuts have been given away to comps, mixtapes, and soundtracks in the five years since Kiss of Death was released that only the slick, polished numbers remain, save the misleading kickoff "Pain & Torture."

Steve Jones of USA Today said, "Though Kiss isn't as gritty as his previous efforts — a sign of maturity, perhaps — he still serves up plenty of bangers for hard cases. There's no shortage of songs boasting of his accomplishments, 'hood credentials and microphone prowess. But he also takes a broader view and more varied sonic palette." HipHopDX said, "Even if there are a handful of tracks that should've been shaved off, there's nothing outright bad on The Last Kiss and a lot that's good. It probably won't be a standout in his overall catalogue when its all said and done (especially compared to the disgracefully underrated Kiss of Death) but it's a solid entry nonetheless. A good album from a great rapper--give it your time." Simon Vozick-Levinson of Entertainment Weekly said, "When he caters to changed times, the results are forgettable. But when he stays in his lane, there’s no one who can snarl a couplet quite like him."

Commercial performance
The album debuted at number three on the Billboard 200, selling 134,520 copies in its first week. Jadakiss later responded to the sales, by explaining he was pleased with the album's overall success, and that it has since been attributed to traditional marketing.

Track listing
Credits adapted from the album's liner notes.

 (co.) Co-producer

Sample credits
 "Pain & Torture" contains samples of "Montage of Power", written and performed by Ray Russell.
 "Can't Stop Me" contains an interpolation of "Ain't No Mountain High Enough", written by Nickolas Ashford and Valerie Simpson.
 "Things I've Been Through" contains samples of "Promise Me", written and performed by Luther Vandross.
 "Cartel Gathering" contains a sample of "Warm Ride", written by Barry Gibb, Maurice Gibb, and Robin Gibb, as performed by Rare Earth.
 "Come and Get Me" contains samples of "This Is My Night", written by David Frank and Mic Murphy, as performed by Chaka Khan.
 "By My Side" contains interpolations of "I Need Your Lovin'", written by Teena Marie Brockert.
 "Letter to B.I.G." contains interpolations from "This Time I'll Be Sweeter", written by Gwen Guthrie and Patrick Grant.

Charts

Weekly charts

Year-end charts

References

External links
 

2009 albums
Albums produced by the Alchemist (musician)
Albums produced by Mr. Porter
Albums produced by Eric Hudson
Albums produced by Needlz
Albums produced by the Neptunes
Albums produced by Swizz Beatz
Def Jam Recordings albums
Jadakiss albums
Roc-A-Fella Records albums
D-Block Records albums
Albums produced by Buckwild
Ruff Ryders Entertainment albums
Albums produced by the Inkredibles
Albums produced by Neo da Matrix